Endel Rivers (born Endel Jõgi; 15 April 1959, in Estonia) is an Estonian-Australian musician, composer and music producer. He started his music career in the 1970s. Hailing originally from Estonia, Endel moved to Australia in 1989. In 2006 Rivers was given an award at Australia's premier MusicOz Awards in instrumental category.

Discography
Hardbite (2002, CD) Issued by Palmstudios
Hardbite II (2005, CD) Issued by Palmstudios
The Jaz Symphony (2011, CD) Issued by Palmstudios

References

External links 
 
 
 

1959 births
Living people
Estonian emigrants to Australia
Australian rock musicians
Estonian rock musicians
Australian rock guitarists
Estonian rock guitarists
20th-century Estonian musicians
21st-century Estonian musicians